Amit Kumar (born 1952) is an Indian film playback singer, actor, director, and music director.

Amit Kumar may also refer to:
Amit Kumar (wrestler) (born 1993), Indian wrestler
Amit Kumar Saroha (born 1985), Indian discus thrower
Amit Kumar (doctor)
Amit Kumar (Bangladeshi cricketer) (born 1988), Bangladeshi cricketer
Amit Kumar (Indian cricketer) (born 1989), Indian cricketer
Amit Kumar (cricketer, born 1996), Indian cricketer
Amit Kumar (academic) (born 1976)